Caloptilia emas is a moth of the family Gracillariidae. It is known from Malaysia (Pahang).

References

emas
Moths of Asia
Moths described in 1993